Jeroen Cornelis Johannes Maria van den Bergh  (born August 1, 1965) is an environmental economist of Dutch origin. As of January 2015 he was ICREA Research Professor at Universitat Autònoma de Barcelona and Deputy Director for Research of its Institute of Environmental Science and Technology, and professor of Environmental and Resource Economics at VU University Amsterdam.

Academic career and activities 

Van den Bergh earned a master's degree in Econometrics and Operations Research from Tilburg University in 1988 and a doctorate in economics from VU University Amsterdam (VUA) in 1991. In July 1997 he was appointed professor of Environmental Economics in the Faculty of Economics and Business Administration at VUA and in 2002 he also became a professor in the Institute for Environmental Studies of VUA. In 2002 he was awarded the annual Royal Dutch/Shell Prize (Koninklijke/Shell Prijs) with a purse of 100,000 euros by the Royal Netherlands Academy of Arts and Sciences, for his research related to sustainable development and energy.  In September 2007 he was appointed ICREA Research Professor at  Universitat Autònoma de Barcelona (UAB), and honorary professor of Environmental and Resource Economics at VUA. In 2010 he became the editor-in-chief of the Elsevier journal Environmental Innovation and Societal Transitions  From 2007 to 2009 he  was a member of the Energy Council of The Netherlands. In 2004 he was appointed a member of the scientific advisory board of the Austrian Institute of Economic Research. In 2016 he was appointed Member of the Board of Directors of the Beijer Institute of Ecological Economics. On 26 September 2019 the Open University of the Netherlands awarded him an honorary doctorate (“eredoctoraat” in Dutch).

According to his ICREA profile page as of March 2015, his research is on "the intersection of economics, environmental science and innovation studies. Past work includes dematerialization and recycling, ecological-economic modelling, construction of aggregate economic and environmental performance indicators, the growth-versus-environment debate, and spatial/international aspects of environmental policy. Work in recent years involves evolutionary economics, environmental innovation, and economic analysis of climate policy and a transition to a low-carbon economy."

As of March 2015 he had published about 150 papers and (co-)authored or edited 16 books.

According to RePEc, as of February 2015 van den Bergh was ranked #16 among the 1,904 economists of Spain. As of March 2015 he was a member of the Academia Europaea.

Selected books 
 

 J.C.J.M. van den Bergh (ed.) (1999), Handbook of Environmental and Resource Economics. Edward Elgar Publ., Cheltenham, UK  
 J.C.J.M. van den Bergh, A. Barendregt and A. Gilbert (2004). Spatial Ecological-Economic Analysis for Wetland Management: Modelling and Scenario Evaluation of Land Use, Cambridge University Press.  
 J.C.J.M. van den Bergh and M.A. Janssen (eds.) (2005). Economics of Industrial Ecology: Use of Materials, Structural Change and Spatial Scales. The MIT Press. 
 J.C.J.M. van den Bergh, J. Hoekstra, R. Imeson, P. Nunes and A. de Blaeij (2006). Economic Modeling and Policy Analysis of Exploited Marine Ecosystems. Springer. 
 J.C.J.M. van den Bergh, A. Faber, A.M. Idenburg and F.H. Oosterhuis (2007). Evolutionary Economics and Environmental Policy: Survival of the Greenest. Edward Elgar.

Selected articles 
As of March 2015 the five most cited articles in Google Scholar by Van den Bergh were:

References

External link

1965 births
Living people
Environmental economists
Climate economists
Energy economists
Innovation economists
Growth economists
Ecological economists 
Sustainability advocates
Dutch economists
Dutch expatriates in Spain
Tilburg University alumni
Vrije Universiteit Amsterdam alumni
Academic staff of the Autonomous University of Barcelona
Academic staff of Vrije Universiteit Amsterdam
Members of Academia Europaea
Academic journal editors